The Shrike is a 1955 American film noir drama film based on Joseph Kramm's play of the same name. José Ferrer directed and starred in Ketti Frings' screenplay adaptation.

Plot
Successful stage director Jim Downs (Ferrer) is driven to a mental breakdown by his domineering wife Ann (June Allyson). Institutionalized, he confides in Dr. Bellman (Kendall Clark) and Dr. Barrow (Isabel Bonner), and he finds a kindred spirit in Charlotte Moore (Joy Page).

Cast

 José Ferrer as Jim Downs
 June Allyson as Ann Downs
 Joy Page as Charlotte Moore
 Kendall Clark as Dr. Bellman
 Isabel Bonner as Dr. Barrow
 Will Kuluva as Ankoritis 
 Joe Comadore as Major
 Billy M. Greene as Schloss
 Leigh Whipper as Mr. Carlisle
 Richard Benedict as Gregory
 Mary Bell as Miss Wingate
 Martin Newman as Carlos O'Brien
 Herbie Faye as Tager
 Somer Alberg as Dr. Schlesinger
 Jay Barney as Dr. Kramer
 Edward C. Platt as Harry Downs
 Fay Morley as Jennifer Logan
 Jacqueline de Wit as Katharine Meade

Uncredited (in order of appearance)

 Adrienne Marden as Miss Raymond
 Douglas Henderson as Burt Fielding
 Helen Beverly as Miss Thatcher
 Shawn Smith as Celia Johns
 Joanne Jordan as Miss Cardell
 Stafford Repp as Fleming
 Nancy Kulp as Mrs. Colman
 Dennis Moore as Spectator
 Tom Wilson as Actor in play 
 Pauline Moore as Author's wife
 Kenneth Drake as Author 
 Nicky Blair as Patient
 Sara Seegar as Mrs. Cory
 John Farrow as Englishman
 Jean Fenwick as Mrs. Ellison

Production
In 1952 Ferrer announced Hal Wallis and Bill Pearlberg were both interested in filming the play.

Ferrer spent two years developing the script with Ketti Frings. For a time it seemed he might make it at RKO. In March 1953 Ferrer announced he had purchased the film rights himself.

He had discussions with Columbia. Then in February 1954 Ferrer signed a deal with Universal to finance.

"I'm terribly grateful to have been given the opportunity to star and direct", said Ferrer.

In April 1954 it was announced June Allyson would star alongside Ferrer. Allyson had never played this type of role before. "I was fed to the teeth being sweet", she said.

Filming started in September 1954. Much of the film was shot on location at Bellevue Hospital and around Times Square in New York City.

Ferrer had the film scheduled so the cast would rehearse, then shoot, then filming would stop while the cast would rehearse again, then shoot again. Frings was on set the whole time to assist Ferrer's direction.

The music score was by Frank Skinner. Ferrer composed "Conversation (The Shrike)", recorded by Pete Rugolo on his 1955 album New Sounds (Harmony HL7003). The opening title sequence was created by Saul Bass.

Reception
Reviewing for The New York Times, A. H. Weiler wrote:
José Ferrer, the director and star of the play, again is portraying the Broadway director who struggles to be released from the confines of the psychiatric ward even though it means a return to a hateful marriage. And, in making his debut as a film director, Mr. Ferrer proves that he is as expert behind the camera as he is across the footlights. Since he obviously is no stranger to his source material, his performance is at once polished, powerful and moving. And many of his principals, who are re-enacting the roles they created on stage, forcefully enhance the stark vista of life in a mental ward... As our sorely beset hero relates in flashback to probing psychiatrists, it was a happy union at first, full of love and companionship. It deteriorated slowly but inexorably, as did his career, when her insatiable yearning for the life of an actress and her meddling in his affairs reached a point of no return... Backstage and hospital sequences have a documentary authenticity heightened in effect by Mr. Ferrer's portrayal. His scenes in the nightmarish world of the mental ward and his climactic session with the psychiatrists as he tearfully and desperately agrees to return to his wife, is acting of a rare order... Although The Shrike has changed its tune it still is an unusual and immensely interesting film drama.
Allyson later said her husband Dick Powell and all her advisers opposed her making the movie:
But it was a challenge I could not resist. For years I had been the Perfect... And now..., I would be far from the perfect wife. I would indeed be a monster of a wife, one of the least attractive in the history of the theater. As it turned out, the picture was a wonderful flop, but I do not regret deciding to play the vixen, Ann Downs. Other than my personal satisfaction in making my own decision, The Shrike was fun, and I even dreamed vaguely of an Academy Award.

See also
List of American films of 1955

References

Sources

External links

1955 films
1955 drama films
American black-and-white films
American drama films
American films based on plays
1950s English-language films
Films directed by José Ferrer
Films scored by Frank Skinner
Films set in New York City
Films set in psychiatric hospitals
Films shot in New York City
Films with screenplays by Ketti Frings
Universal Pictures films
1950s American films